Street Smart is a 1987 American crime thriller film directed by Jerry Schatzberg and starring Christopher Reeve, Morgan Freeman and Kathy Baker. It was shot in New York City and Montreal, Quebec.

Despite being well-received by audiences and critics (especially being Morgan Freeman's first Oscar-nominated performance), the film was a commercial failure.

Plot
Jonathan Fisher, a struggling magazine reporter based in New York City, is having difficulty pitching a story to his editor, Ted Avery. Frustrated and worried about his career prospects, he finally pitches a profile on a real-life street pimp, which Ted finds intriguing but gives him a very narrow deadline to meet. Jonathan pays a prostitute for her time, an upbeat former beautician nicknamed Punchy, but finds himself stonewalled by her fear-based loyalty to her pimp, Leo "Fast Black" Smalls, Jr. Across town, Smalls beats up a patron assaulting one of his girls; the patron has a fatal heart attack and Smalls is indicted for second-degree murder.

After an attempt by his girlfriend, Alison, to help approach the nightlife goes disastrously wrong, Jonathan invents the story of a pimp named Tyrone. The story is exceptionally well-received by Ted and the magazine's readership; Jonathan is lured into TV stardom as a result, hosting a news segment called "Street Smart," about people using their "street smarts" on the streets of New York City. However, Jonathan soon comes under pressure from Ted, who is eager to meet "Tyrone" and publish more stories about him, and from an Assistant District Attorney named Leonard Pike, who visits Jonathan at home, angry that his story is granting Smalls' celebrity just when he is going before the court. Jon denies that Tyrone and Smalls are the same person, but Pike does not believe him, and even Smalls' own legal team believes that Smalls is the subject, so strong are the parallels. Smalls' lawyer subpoenas the notes of Jonathan's article, knowing that Ted, Jonathan and the magazine will refuse, and that their refusal to cooperate will imply to a jury that Smalls should be exonerated of the murder. Meanwhile, Smalls, Punchy, and Smalls' lieutenant, Reggie, start hanging around with Jonathan, even attending a magazine fundraiser in Ted's home as the guests of honour. Jonathan and Punchy have in the meantime become romantically involved, causing Alison to break up with Jonathan.

Despite his often charming exterior, Smalls is a violent and unpredictable man; he nearly cuts up the face of his favorite prostitute, Darlene, when he believes she is skimming from her earnings. Smalls, who knows that the magazine article isn't about him, asks Jonathan to create notes that show that their interview coincided with the time of the murder, therefore giving him an alibi. Jonathan is subpoenaed to appear at Smalls' trial and ordered to hand over said notes (which only Jonathan and Alison know for certain do not exist). Jonathan declines to comply, is found in contempt of court and summarily held in custody. Jonathan makes bail, and then admits to the magazine's lawyer representing him that he made up the entire story, that the similarities between the Tyrone character of the story and the circumstances of Smalls' life are purely coincidental and tries to back out, but the judge on the case shows him photos Pike had taken of Smalls and Jonathan eating together during their first public meeting, and is held in contempt and remanded into custody once again. Pike then approaches Punchy, who initially refuses to answer his questions and unsuccessfully tries to seduce him, but when she later tries to tell Smalls she wants to stop turning tricks for him, Smalls threatens to cut out her eye and he makes Punchy choose which eye he will take. After she tearfully chooses her left eye, Smalls relents and lets her go. Punchy runs straight back to Pike and tells him Smalls wants Jonathan to fabricate the aforementioned notes, but Smalls kills her shortly after she leaves Pike's apartment. Pike, having identified Punchy's body at the morgue, visits Jonathan in jail to inform him of her murder, and also tells him that he knows about what Smalls wants Jonathan to do, angrily advising him not to do it. Meanwhile, on Smalls' orders, Reggie stabs Alison as she goes shopping and puts her in the hospital.

Trapped and with nothing left to do, Jonathan changes his story again and declares that he will produce the notes and is released. He meets Smalls and agrees to give him the alibi he needs. Smalls is found not guilty, and a furious Pike tells Jonathan that he'll be pursuing him for fabricating evidence. When Jonathan asks what he would get out of that, Pike replies "satisfaction". Despite the criminal charges hanging over his head, Jonathan's journalistic reputation remains intact and he and Alison get back together. In revenge for Alison's stabbing, Jonathan entraps Reggie by videotaping him accepting $200 from Darlene (which was given to her by Jonathan who asked her to tell Reggie it came from Smalls), which makes it look as if Reggie is the one skimming from Smalls. Jonathan then warns a terrified Reggie that he should skip town before Jonathan shows the videotape to Smalls.

Smalls, unaware of the videotape, has been looking for the recently absent Reggie. He finally locates him, but Reggie, convinced that Smalls is coming to kill him, takes off running. As Smalls gives chase, Reggie trips and falls. Confused by Reggie's behavior, Smalls approaches, and Reggie, afraid for his life, shoots Smalls dead. As Reggie is taken away in handcuffs, Jonathan reports on Smalls' execution for his latest "Street Smart" segment.

Cast
Christopher Reeve as Jonathan Fisher
Morgan Freeman as Leo Smalls, Jr. a.k.a. Fast Black
Kathy Baker as Punchy
Mimi Rogers as Alison Parker
Andre Gregory as Ted Avery
Jay Patterson as A.D.A. Leonard Pike
Anna Maria Horsford as Harriet
Erik King as Reggie
Shari Hilton as Darlene
Rick Aviles as Solo

Production
Street Smart was a long-time pet project of Christopher Reeve, but he was having difficulty getting the film financed. When the Cannon Group acquired the rights to Superman IV: The Quest for Peace, Reeve agreed to do the film partly because Cannon promised to give Street Smart the financial backing it needed.

Miles Davis and Robert Irving III recorded the complete soundtrack.

Reception
The film gained positive reviews. It currently holds a 67% rating on Rotten Tomatoes, based on 15 reviews.

The film performed poorly at the box office, primarily attributed to Cannon Films' failure to properly market the theatrical release.

Awards and nominations
Morgan Freeman was nominated for an Academy Award and a Golden Globe Award for Best Supporting Actor for his role. Despite having appeared in The Electric Company during the 1970s, Freeman considered Fast Black to be his breakthrough role. He also considers the role to be his favorite Oscar-nominated performance.

References

External links
 
 
 
 

1987 films
American crime drama films
1980s English-language films
1980s crime drama films
Films about journalists
Golan-Globus films
Films directed by Jerry Schatzberg
Films set in New York City
Films shot in Montreal
Films shot in New York City
1987 drama films
Films produced by Menahem Golan
Films produced by Yoram Globus
1980s American films